Jeremy James Miller (born October 21, 1976) is an American actor. He is known for his portrayal of Ben Seaver on Growing Pains and its two reunion movies. He also voiced Linus van Pelt in Happy New Year, Charlie Brown!.

Career
Miller was cast in a few commercials, then a 1984 guest role in Punky Brewster before landing the role of Ben Seaver, the younger son  on Growing Pains. After Growing Pains, he appeared in the film Milk and Fashion, in commercials for McDonald's "Dollar Menunaires" promotion shot as a parody of the VH1 series Best Week Ever, and as the star of the 1990 Hanukah episode of Shalom Sesame (an Israeli version of Sesame Street). He has also been spotted in Boys and Girls Guide To Getting Down. He appeared in a special celebrity team-up episode of Where in the World Is Carmen Sandiego? facing off against Mayim Bialik from Blossom, and Tatyana Ali from The Fresh Prince of Bel-Air; he and his partner got through to the bonus round in the end (but failed to win the big prize). 

He can be seen in four movies in 2009: Ditching Party, Never Have I Ever, The Fish and Tar Beach.

While promoting Start Fresh Recovery of Santa Ana, California in April 2014, Miller said he started drinking alcohol at age four. Miller states that he suffered from alcohol abuse for years, until he had an implant that released the drug Naltrexone into his system. In 2011, he became a spokesperson for Fresh Start Private Management Inc., the rehabilitation company that administered his treatment.

Filmography

Personal life
At about age 14, Miller received numerous letters from an older male stalker during the run of Growing Pains.

Miller attended the University of Southern California for one year. He is married to Joanie Miller and has three stepsons.

References

External links

1976 births
American male child actors
American male film actors
American male television actors
Living people